The  Military Ordinariate of Ecuador  is a Latin Church military ordinariate of the Catholic Church in Ecuador. It is immediately exempt to the Holy See and its Roman Congregation for Bishops. it is headquartered Apartado 17-03-758, Av. América 1830 y Mercadillo in Quito, the capital of Ecuador. It provides pastoral care to Catholics serving in the Ecuadorian Armed Forces and their families.

Statistics 
, the ordinariate had 118 missions with 60 priests (50 diocesan, 10 religious) and 10 lay religious (brothers).

History 
It was established as Military vicariate of Ecuador on 30 March 1983, with the first military vicar appointment on 5 August 1983.
 
It was elevated to Military ordinariate on 21 July 1986, the incumbent accordingly promoted.

Ordinaries 
(all Roman Rite) 

 Military Vicar of Ecuador
 Juan Ignacio Larrea Holguín (5 August 1983 – 21 July 1986 see below), Titular Bishop of (Herceg) Novi (1983.08.05 – 1988.03.25); previously Auxiliary Bishop of Quito (Ecuador) (1969.05.17 – 1980.06.28?) and Titular Bishop of Cellæ in Proconsulari (1969.05.17 – 1980.06.28), next Bishop of Ibarra (Ecuador) (1980.06.28 – 1983.08.05)

Military Ordinaries of Ecuador
 Juan Ignacio Larrea Holguín (see above 21 July 1986 – 7 December 1989), also Coadjutor Archbishop of Guayaquil (Ecuador) (1988.03.25 – 1989.12.07); next succeeded as Metropolitan Archbishop of Guayaquil (1989.12.07 – retired 2003.05.07), died 2006
 Raúl Eduardo Vela Chiriboga (8 July 1989 – 21 March 2003), Titular Bishop of Pauzera (1989.07.08 – 1998.03.07); previously Titular Bishop of Ausafa (1972.04.20 – 1975.04.29) as Auxiliary Bishop of Guayaquil (1972.04.20 – 1975.04.29) and then Bishop of Azogues (Ecuador) (1975.04.29 – 1989.07.08); later Metropolitan Archbishop of Quito (2003.03.21 – 2010.09.11), created Cardinal-Priest of S. Maria in Via (2010.11.20 [2010.11.28] – ...)
 Miguel Angel Aguilar Miranda (14 February 2004 – retired 18 June 2014); previously Bishop of Guaranda (Ecuador) (1991.04.11 – 2004.02.14)
 Segundo René Coba Galarza (18 June 2014 – 12 December 2019), also Secretary General of Episcopal Conference of Ecuador (2014.05.08 – ...); previously Titular Bishop of Vegesela in Byzacena (2006.06.07 – 2014.06.18) as Auxiliary Bishop of above Quito (2006.06.07 – 2014.06.18); next Bishop of Ibarra (2019.12.12 - ...)

See also 

 List of Catholic dioceses in Honduras

References

Sources and external links 
 GCatholic - Obispado Castrense del Ecuador with incumbent bio links 
 Military Ordinariate of Ecuador (Catholic-Hierarchy)

Roman Catholic dioceses in Ecuador
Military ordinariates
Roman Catholic dioceses and prelatures established in the 20th century
Christian organizations established in 1983
1983 establishments in Ecuador